Trafford Football Club is an English football club based in Flixton, near Urmston in the Metropolitan Borough of Trafford, in Greater Manchester. The club are currently members of the Northern Premier League Division One West and play at The First Point Shawe View Stadium.

History
The club was established in 1990 as North Trafford, founded by David Brown, John Harrison, David Law, and Bill Whitten. They applied to join Mid-Cheshire League and despite being initially rejected, were admitted to Division Two after a late withdrawal. They finished as runners-up in their first season, and were promoted to Division One. The following season they finished fourth and moved up to Division Two of the North West Counties League. In 1993–94 they finished second and were promoted to Division One, at which point they adopted their current name.

In 1996–97 they won Division One and were promoted to Division One of the Northern Premier League. In 1999–00 they won the President's Cup, but in 2002–03 they finished bottom of the division and were relegated back to the North West Counties League. They won the league again in 2007–08 and were promoted back to the Northern Premier League. In their first season back in the league they won the President's Cup for a second time.

Ground
Trafford have played at Shawe View in Urmston since their formation, initially sharing the ground with Trafford Borough Rugby League Club but soon gaining sole tenancy and a 30-year lease. Floodlights and a stand were built in 1993.

Honours
Northern Premier League
President's Cup winners 1999–00, 2008–09
First Division Cup winners 1997–98
League Cup winners 2018–19
North West Counties League
Division One champions 1996–97, 2007–08

Records
FA Cup
Third Qualifying Round 2006–07, 2012–13, 2013–14
FA Trophy
Third Round 2000–01
FA Vase
Fifth Round 1995–96

References

External links

 
Association football clubs established in 1990
Football clubs in England
Northern Premier League clubs
North West Counties Football League clubs
Football clubs in Trafford
1990 establishments in England